

The table below includes sites listed on the National Register of Historic Places in Bergen County, New Jersey except those in Closter, Franklin Lakes, Ridgewood, Saddle River and Wyckoff, which are listed separately (links to these other lists are provided below). Latitude and longitude coordinates of the sites listed on this page may be displayed in a map or exported in several formats by clicking on one of the links in the box below the map of New Jersey to the right.

There are 277 properties and districts in the county that are listed on the National Register, including four National Historic Landmarks. One site once listed on the Register has been removed.

Current listings

Communities listed separately

Other communities in Bergen County

|}

Former listings

|}

References

External links

Bergen